Sarah E. O'Connor is an American molecular biologist working to understand the molecular machinery involved in assembling important plant natural products – vinblastine, morphine, iridoids, secologanin – and how changing the enzymes involved in this pathway lead to diverse analogs. She was a Project Leader at the John Innes Centre in the UK between 2011 and 2019. O'Connor was appointed by the Max Planck Society in 2018 to head the Department of Natural Product Biosynthesis at the Max Planck Institute for Chemical Ecology in Jena, Germany, taking up her role during 2019.

Education 
O'Connor received her Ph.D. working with Barbara Imperiali on conformational effects induced by large proteins at the Massachusetts Institute of Technology (MIT). She was a postdoctoral fellow at Harvard Medical School, where she worked on epothiolone biosynthesis with Professor Christopher T. Walsh. She later returned to MIT as a professor from 2003 to 2010.

Research 
O'Connor's work involves detailed study of many important species of medicinally-relevant plants: Rauvolfia serpentina, Catharanthus roseus, and Aspergillus japonicus. Her lab utilizes bioinformatics and enzyme characterization to uncover new pathways by which plants construct these molecules. Insertion of new enzymes, for example a halogenase or oxidase results in novel variants of the molecules not found in nature.

Awards 

Pfizer Award in Enzyme Chemistry 2011
Royal Society Wolfson Research Merit Award 2011
Wain Medal 2013
 Elected to European Molecular Biology Organization 2017
European Research Council (ERC) Advanced Grant 2018 
Royal Society of Chemistry Perkin Prize for Organic Chemistry 2019
 Ernest Guenther Award in the Chemistry of Natural Products of the American Chemical Society 2021
 Gottfried Wilhelm Leibniz Prize 2023

References

American molecular biologists
Year of birth missing (living people)
American women biologists
Massachusetts Institute of Technology alumni
Massachusetts Institute of Technology faculty
Living people
American women academics
21st-century American women
Max Planck Institute directors